Washington is the county seat of Wilkes County, Georgia, United States. Under its original name Heard's Fort, it was briefly designated as the state capital during the American Revolutionary War. It is noted as the place where the Confederacy voted to dissolve itself, effectively ending the American Civil War.

The population was 4,134 as of the 2010 census. The city is often referred to as Washington-Wilkes, to distinguish it from other places named Washington.

History
Heard's Fort was established in 1774 by colonist Stephen Heard. The settlement served as the temporary capital of the new state of Georgia from February 3, 1780, until early 1781.

American Revolutionary War
The Battle of Kettle Creek, one of the most important battles of the American Revolutionary War to be fought in Georgia, was fought on February 14, 1779, in Wilkes County, about eight miles (13 km) from present-day Washington. The American Patriots were victorious, taking 75 prisoners and killing roughly 70 Loyalists, while losing 32 of their own men.

American Civil War
As a child, Alexander H. Stephens had studied at the school in Washington presided over by Presbyterian minister Alexander Hamilton Webster. He later became a politician and was elected as Vice-President of the Confederacy.

No major battles of the Civil War were fought in or near Washington, but the city is notable as the site where Confederate President Jefferson Davis held his last meeting with his cabinet. On April 3, 1865, with Union troops under General Ulysses S. Grant poised to capture the capital at Richmond, Virginia, Davis escaped for Danville, together with the Confederate cabinet.

After leaving Danville, and continuing south, Davis met with his Cabinet for the last time on May 5, 1865, in Washington, along with a hand-picked escort led by Given Campbell, including his personal body guard, Sgt. Joseph A Higgenbotham, Jr., of Amherst/Nelson County, Virginia. The meeting took place at the Heard house (now used as the Georgia Branch Bank Building), with fourteen officials present.

Historic sites
Several historic sites in Washington are on the National Register of Historic Places, including the Wilkes County Courthouse, the Robert Toombs House State Historic Site, the Washington-Wilkes Historical Museum, the Mary Willis Public Library, Cherry Grove Baptist Church Schoolhouse, and the recently restored historic Fitzpatrick Hotel, built in 1898.

Geography
Washington is located at  (33.735394, −82.741420).

Demographics

2020 census

As of the 2020 United States Census, there were 3,754 people, 1,646 households, and 904 families residing in the city.

2010 census
As of the 2010 United States Census, there were 4,134 people living in the city. The racial makeup of the city was 60.4% Black, 35.3% White, 0.1% Native American, 0.7% Asian, 0.2% from some other race and 1.7% from two or more races. 1.5% were Hispanic or Latino of any race.

2000 census
As of the census of 2000, there were 4,295 people, 1,778 households, and 1,162 families living in the city. The racial makeup of the city was 38.04% White, 60.75% African American, 0.07% Native American, 0.30% Asian, 0.05% from other races, and 0.79% from two or more races. Hispanic or Latino of any race were 0.47% of the population.

There were 1,778 households, out of which 28.4% had children under the age of 18 living with them, 37.2% were married couples living together, 24.4% had a female householder with no husband present, and 34.6% were non-families. 31.8% of all households were made up of individuals, and 17.0% had someone living alone who was 65 years of age or older. The average household size was 2.36 and the average family size was 2.97.

In the city, the population was spread out, with 24.1% under the age of 18, 8.9% from 18 to 24, 25.7% from 25 to 44, 22.1% from 45 to 64, and 19.2% who were 65 years of age or older. The median age was 39 years. For every 100 females, there were 79.3 males. For every 100 females age 18 and over, there were 72.9 males.

The median income for a household in the city was $25,667, and the median income for a family was $32,500. Males had a median income of $27,281 versus $21,230 for females. The per capita income for the city was $13,659. About 17.6% of families and 23.0% of the population were below the poverty line, including 32.7% of those under age 18 and 23.2% of those age 65 or over.

Education

The Wilkes County School District holds pre-school to grade twelve, and consists of one primary school, one elementary school, a middle school, and a high school. The district has 116 full-time teachers and over 1,858 students.
Washington-Wilkes Elementary School
Washington-Wilkes Primary School
Washington-Wilkes Middle School
Washington-Wilkes Comprehensive High School

Dr. Rosemary Caddell is the Superintendent of Schools.

In popular culture
One of Washington's most lingering mysteries is that of the lost Confederate gold. As the last recorded location of the remaining Confederate gold, the Washington area is thought to be the site where it is buried. Worth roughly $100,000 when it disappeared in 1865, at 2016 prices its value would be around $3.6 million. The cable television channel A&E produced a documentary focusing on this legend.

Notable people
 Edward Porter Alexander – officer in the U.S. Army, Confederate general in the American Civil War, railroad executive
 James Osgood Andrew – bishop
 Edward McKendree Bounds – clergyman and author
 Lloyd D. Brown – United States Army major general who commanded the 28th Infantry Division in World War II
 Ernie Harwell – broadcaster for Major League Baseball, "The Voice of the Tigers"
 Hillary Lindsey – Grammy Award–winning songwriter
 Tom Nash – professional football and baseball player
 Robert Toombs – first Secretary of State of the Confederacy, slaveholder, Confederate general in the Civil War
 William Henry Pope – Texas politician
 Fred Thomas– guitarist for James Brown

See also

 Central Savannah River Area
 Jackson Chapel
 List of municipalities in Georgia (U.S. state)
 List of memorials to George Washington
 National Register of Historic Places listings in Wilkes County, Georgia

References

Further reading

External links

 Government

 General information

Mary Willis Public Library at Bartram Trail Regional Library System
Washington-Wilkes Chamber of Commerce

1774 establishments in Georgia (U.S. state)
Cities in Georgia (U.S. state)
Cities in Wilkes County, Georgia
County seats in Georgia (U.S. state)
Georgia (U.S. state)
Planned cities in the United States
Populated places established in 1774